The 2011 FIVB Volleyball Boys' Youth World Championship was held in Bahía Blanca and Burzaco, Argentina from 19 to 28 August 2011. Sixteen teams participated in the tournament.

Pools composition

Venues
Estadio Osvaldo Casanova, Bahía Blanca, Argentina – Pool B, D, E, F, 5th–8th places and Championship
Polideportivo Almirante Brown, Burzaco, Argentina – Pool A, C, G, H, 13th–16th places and 9th–12th places

Pool standing procedure
 Match points
 Number of matches won
 Sets ratio
 Points ratio
 Result of the last match between the tied teams

Match won 3–0 or 3–1: 3 match points for the winner, 0 match points for the loser
Match won 3–2: 2 match points for the winner, 1 match point for the loser

First round

Pool A

|}

|}

Pool B

|}

|}

Pool C

|}

|}

Pool D

|}

|}

Second round

Pool E

|}

|}

Pool F

|}

|}

Pool G

|}

|}

Pool H

|}

|}

Final round

Classification 13th–16th

|}

Classification 9th–12th

|}

Classification 5th–8th

|}

Classification 1st–4th

|}

15th place match

|}

13th place match

|}

11th place match

|}

9th place match

|}

7th place match

|}

5th place match

|}

3rd place match

|}

Final

|}

Final standing

Team roster
Uroš Kovačević, Luka Medić, Lazar Ilincić, Aleksa Brdjović, Cedomir Stanković, Milan Katić, Aleksandar Okolić, Sasa Popović, Mihajlo Stanković, Dimitrije Pantić, Sinisa Zarković and Aleksandar Blagojević
Head Coach: Milan Đuričić.

Individual awards

Most Valuable Player:
Best Scorer:
Best Spiker:
Best Blocker:
Best Server:
Best Libero:
Best Setter:
Best Diggers:
Best Receivers:

References

External links
 Official Website
 Serbia retains the crown in five-set thriller

FIVB Volleyball Boys' U19 World Championship
World Youth Championship
V
International volleyball competitions hosted by Argentina